Polonia Nowy Tomyśl was a Polish football club located in the town of Nowy Tomyśl, Greater Poland Voivodeship.

History 
Polonia Nowy Tomyśl was established in 1922, and for much of its history has competed in lower regional and amateur leagues in Poland. The club first gained promotion to the senior league system in 1958, reaching the III liga, which was then a league at the third tier of the Polish football pyramid. It repeated this achievement in 1992, before suffering a series of relegations to the regional leagues at the sixth tier level. In the 21st century, the club has made significant progress back up the league system, achieving promotions to the IV liga (2004), the III liga (2008) and the II Liga West (2010).

After the end of the 2011–12 season of the IV liga Greater Poland, the team was dissolved. In 2016, it was reactivated under the name of Nowotomyska Akademia Piłkarska Polonia Nowy Tomyśl and joined the Klasa A.

Achievements 
 III Liga (Kuyavian-Pomeranian-Wielkopolska region)
 Winners (1): 2009-10

 V Liga (Poznań region)
 Winners (1): 2003-04

See also 
 Football in Poland

References 

Association football clubs established in 1922
Football clubs in Greater Poland Voivodeship
1922 establishments in Poland